In algebra, given a category C with a cotriple, the n-th cotriple homology of an object X in C with coefficients in a functor E is the n-th homotopy group of the E of the augmented simplicial object induced from X by the cotriple. The term "homology" is because in the abelian case, by the Dold–Kan correspondence, the homotopy groups are the homology of the corresponding chain complex.

Example: Let N be a left module over a ring R and let . Let F be the left adjoint of the forgetful functor from the category of rings to Set; i.e., free module functor.

Example (algebraic K-theory): Let us write GL for the functor . As before,  defines a cotriple on the category of rings with F free ring functor and U forgetful. For a ring R, one has:
 
where on the left is the n-th K-group of R. This example is an instance of nonabelian homological algebra.

Notes

References

Further reading 
Who Threw a Free Algebra in My Free Algebra?, a blog post.

Adjoint functors
Category theory
Homotopy theory